The Leipzig class was a group of two screw corvettes built for the German Kaiserliche Marine (Imperial Navy) in the 1870s. They were based on the earlier corvette , but were significantly larger, carried a stronger armament, and unlike the wooden-hulled s, adopted iron construction, making them the first corvettes of the German fleet to be built with iron. Originally intended to serve abroad and with the fleet, British experiences during the Battle of Pacocha in 1877 convinced the German naval command that unarmored warships were useless against the fleets of ironclads being built by the European navies, and so Leipzig and Prinz Adalbert would be used only on foreign stations.

The ships went on two cruises each in the late 1870s and early 1880s, primarily to East Asia. In 1878, Leipzig was involved with a diplomatic dispute with Nicaragua. Prinz Adalbert was used to secure Germany's growing colonial empire in Africa. In the mid-1880s, Leipzig was heavily rebuilt to allow her use as a squadron flagship on foreign stations. She served abroad in this capacity from 1888 to 1893; during this extended deployment, she participated in the campaign to suppress the Abushiri revolt in German East Africa in 1888–1890. She then alternated between East Africa, China, and Chile, where she protected German nationals during the Chilean Civil War of 1891. In the meantime, Prinz Adalbert had been converted into a training ship in 1886, and served in that role for three years, before being reduced to a barracks ship in May 1890. In 1907, she was sold for scrap; by that time, Leipzig too had been reduced to a barracks ship and stationary training hulk in 1895, though she survived until 1919, when she sank accidentally. Raised in 1921, she too was broken up for scrap.

Design

The development of the Leipzig plan traces as far back as the fleet plan of 1867, which was created by Eduard von Jachmann. The plan was an expansion program aimed at strengthening the Prussian Navy in the wake of the Austro-Prussian War, and it called for a total of twenty screw corvettes. By the time that design work began on the Leipzig class in 1871, Prussia had won the Franco-Prussian War of 1870–1871, forming the German Empire in the process. General Albrecht von Stosch, the new Chief of the Kaiserliche Admiralität (Imperial Admiralty), adopted Jachmann's plan for unarmored corvettes in the fleet plan of 1873. At the time, there was significant debate in what was now the Kaiserliche Marine (Imperial Navy) over the use of iron to construct the hull of large warships, rather than traditional wood planking. The iron-hulled  of ironclad warships that had been begun in 1868 proved to be a success, as had the British screw frigate , the first iron-hulled cruising warship in the world. As a result, the Construction Department decided to adopt an iron hull for the new corvette design.

The new design was prepared in 1871–1872, and work began two years later. The designers had intended that the ships would be used as reconnaissance vessels for the main fleet in addition to normal cruiser duties like showing the flag, protecting German merchant shipping, and securing German economic interests abroad. But shortly before work on the two corvettes was completed, the British frigate  and the corvette  fought the Peruvian ironclad Huáscar in the Battle of Pacocha, which demonstrated that unarmored warships were effectively useless against modern armored warships. So Leipzig and Prinz Adalbert would be used only on foreign deployments where they would be unlikely to encounter such vessels. Carl Paschen, who later commanded both ships during his career, described them as "livable ships", praising their spacious hulls that proved to be well-suited to the ships' long deployments abroad.

Characteristics

The ships' hulls were constructed with transverse and longitudinal iron frames, with two layers of wood planking and a layer of copper sheathing to protect the hulls from biofouling on long-distance cruises where periodic maintenance would not be possible. The hulls were divided into seven watertight compartments; Leipzig was heavily rebuilt in the mid-1880s, and her hull was divided into nine and later ten compartments. Both ships had a double bottom under the engine room. The ships were designed with a forecastle, but were completed with a flush deck instead.

Leipzig and Prinz Adalbert were stiff vessels, rolling and pitching badly, particularly when their fuel bunkers were full. They performed moderately under sail. The ship's crew consisted of 39 officers and 386 enlisted men. Each ship carried a number of smaller boats, including one picket boat, two launches, one pinnace, one cutter, two yawls, and one dinghy.

Machinery
Steam was provided by ten coal-fired fire-tube boilers for Leipzig and six fire-tube boilers for Prinz Adalbert. These were placed in a single boiler room and were ducted into a single, retractable funnel. Prinz Adalbert had similar performance. Leipzig and Prinz Adalbert were equipped with a full ship rig to supplement their steam engines on long-distance cruises.

When she was modernized in the mid-1880s, Leipzig received new boilers that necessitated the installation of a second funnel, which unlike her original funnel, was fixed in place. She also had an electrical generator installed, which produced  at 55 Volts.

Armament

The ships of the Leipzig class were armed with a battery of twelve  breech-loading guns, two of which were 25-caliber (cal.); the other ten were shorter 20-cal. weapons. Two of the guns were mounted in the bow as chase guns, while the rest were located on the broadside. Later in their careers, they had four  Hotchkiss revolver cannon installed, along with four  torpedo tubes. These were all above-water launchers, with two in the bow and one on each side. The ships carried a total of ten torpedoes.

Ships

Service history

Leipzig

Leipzig went on two overseas cruises as a training ship for naval cadets early in her career. The first, in 1877–1878, went to Central America and East Asia; while in Central American waters, she was involved in an international dispute between Germany and Nicaragua. The bulk of her time in Asia was spent in Japan and passed uneventfully. The second cruise, which took place from 1882 to 1884, also went to East Asia. During this deployment, she carried the German Consul General from China to Korea to negotiate a trade deal. While on the way back to Germany, she stopped in the newly-proclaimed colony of German Southwest Africa, where she participated in the flag-raising ceremony. From 1885 to 1888, Leipzig was extensively modernized and reconstructed for use as a squadron flagship overseas. Repeated problems with the modernization, particularly over the ship's speed, delayed completion of the work by a year and a half.

In 1888, Leipzig embarked on a major overseas deployment, first to German East Africa, which was in the midst of the Abushiri revolt. Leipzig and several other warships formed a cruiser squadron under the command of Konteradmiral (Rear Admiral) Karl August Deinhard. The ships assisted in the defense of Dar es Salaam and Bagamoyo, bombarded rebel troops along the coast, and sent landing parties ashore to help retake towns that had been captured by the rebels. The revolt was defeated by 1890, allowing Leipzig and the other corvettes of the squadron to sail to East Asia. But after the outbreak of the Chilean Civil War of 1891, the ships were sent to protect German nationals in the country and they sent a landing party to Valparaiso to safeguard Germans in the city. After the war ended, Leipzig sailed to East Africa, where her presence proved to be unnecessary. She continued on to East Asia before being recalled to East Africa owing to fears of renewed conflict resulting from the succession of Sultan Ali bin Said of Zanzibar. This was an unfounded concern, and after an inspection in Cape Town revealed a significant deterioration in her condition, she was recalled to Germany. Found to be not worth repairing, she was converted into a barracks ship and training hulk in 1895, a role she filled until 1919, when she sank unexpectedly. She was raised in 1921 and subsequently broken up that year.

Prinz Adalbert

The second Leipzig-class corvette was originally named Sedan after the 1870 Battle of Sedan of the Franco-Prussian War, but she was renamed Prinz Adalbert in 1878 to avoid antagonizing France. Prinz Adalbert went on two overseas cruises during her career, both to East Asia. The first voyage, which lasted from late 1878 to late 1880, saw the ship pass through the Atlantic, around South America, and across the Pacific to China. Her time there was uneventful, though Prince Heinrich, Kaiser Wilhelm I's grandson, was aboard the ship as part of his naval training. The second cruise, from late 1883 to late 1885, was repeatedly altered; her voyage to East Asia was delayed by an order to carry Crown Prince Friedrich to Spain. From there, she passed through the Suez Canal, transited the Indian Ocean, and then sailed north to China. While she was in Asian waters, she observed the Sino-French War of 1884, during which she helped protect Europeans in China. Prinz Adalbert remained in Asia for less than six months before being ordered home. The return voyage was delayed several times, first with orders to protect German interests in western South America, then to join a new cruiser squadron to settle a dispute with Zanzibar, once again to serve as the flagship of that squadron while the other vessel was being repaired, and again during a colonial dispute with Spain.

After Prinz Adalbert returned to Germany in late 1885, she was converted into a training ship for naval cadets the following year, a role she filled for less than three years. During this period, she conducted training cruises in the Baltic Sea, participated in fleet exercises, and joined the other training ships on long-distance cruises to the West Indies and Cape Verde. Worn out by 1888, she was decommissioned and reduced to a barracks ship, a role she filled until 1907, when she was stricken from the naval register and broken up in Rotterdam.

Notes

References

Further reading